Ceramanus elegans is a species of leafy liverworts in the family Lepidoziaceae. It is found in New Zealand.

The type specimen has registration number H007861 at the Museum of New Zealand. The type locality was Great Barrier Island, North Island, North Auckland.

References

External links 
 
 Ceramanus elegans at uniprot.org

Lepidoziaceae
Plants described in 2013
Flora of New Zealand